Piletocera punctatalis is a moth in the family Crambidae. It was described by Henry Legrand in 1966. It is found on the Seychelles, where it has been recorded from Aldabra.

References

punctatalis
Moths described in 1966
Moths of Africa